The 2006 KNVB Cup Final was a football match between Ajax and PSV on 7 May 2006 at De Kuip, Rotterdam. It was the final match of the 2005–06 KNVB Cup competition. Ajax won 2–1, both of their goals being scored by Klaas-Jan Huntelaar. Michael Lamey scored for PSV.

Route to the final

Match

Details

References

2006
2005–06 in Dutch football
AFC Ajax matches
PSV Eindhoven matches
May 2006 sports events in Europe